Pankaj Kesari is an Indian film actor who worked for Bollywood, Tollywood, and Bhojpuri.

Career
He was a television anchor of a music channel. Pankaj worked as a theatre artist in Patna. He was a theatre artist from Mumbai and Patna. 

Kesari then became a lead actor in various Bhojpuri films. Along with the Bollywood and Bhojpuri film industry, he established himself in the Tamil and Telugu film industries. He appeared in more than 17 Tamil and Telugu language films as lead actor. He starred in more than forty Bhojpuri films before debuting in Telugu with Kaalicharan in a negative role. Some movies by Pankaj Kesari in Tamil and Telugu language are Kalicharan, Mosagallaku Mosagadu, Bam Bholenath, Shivam, Where is Vidyabalan, Araku road Lo, Where is the Venket Lakshmi, Ranarangam, City Maar, Ganla Gonda Ganesh, Driver Ramdu, and Por Kudrai.  After Kaalicharan, Pankaj went on to portray negative roles in other Telugu films including Where Is the Venkatalakshmi (2019).

Filmography

Bhojpuri films

Telugu films

Hindi films

References

External links

Date of birth missing (living people)
Year of birth missing (living people)
Place of birth missing (living people)
Living people
Actors from Patna
Male actors in Bhojpuri cinema
Male actors in Telugu cinema